WNYC is the trademark and a set of call letters shared by WNYC (AM) and WNYC-FM, a pair of nonprofit, noncommercial, public radio stations located in New York City. WNYC is owned by New York Public Radio (NYPR), a nonprofit organization that did business as "WNYC RADIO" until March 2013.

WNYC (AM) broadcasts on 820 kHz, and WNYC-FM broadcasts on 93.9 MHz. Both stations are members of NPR and carry local and national news/talk programs. Some hours the programming is simulcast, some hours different shows air on each station. WNYC reaches more than one million listeners each week and has the largest public radio audience in the United States. The WNYC stations are co-owned with Newark, New Jersey-licensed classical music outlet WQXR-FM (105.9 MHz), and all three broadcast from studios located in the Hudson Square neighborhood in lower Manhattan. WNYC's AM transmitter is located in Kearny, New Jersey; WNYC-FM's transmitter is located at the Empire State Building in New York City.

As of 2018, WNYC also owns and operates the website Gothamist.

History

Early years

WNYC began as WNYC (AM), one of the oldest radio stations in New York. Funds for the establishment of the station were approved on June 2, 1922, by the New York City Board of Estimate and Apportionment. WNYC made its first official broadcast two years later on July 8, 1924, at 570 AM with a second-hand transmitter shipped from Brazil. With the commencement of WNYC's operations, the City of New York became one of the first American municipalities to be directly involved in broadcasting. Studios and transmitter were at The Municipal Building, 1 Centre Street. Herman Neuman was the station's first music director, and oversaw the music department for over 40 years until his retirement in 1967.

In 1928 WNYC was forced into a time-sharing arrangement on 570 AM with WMCA, another pioneering New York radio outlet. This situation lasted until 1931, when the Federal Radio Commission (a forerunner to today's FCC) moved WNYC to 810 AM. The frequency move did not help WNYC from an operational standpoint as it now had to share its frequency with the more-powerful WCCO in Minneapolis, limiting WNYC to daytime-only operations, broadcasting from sunrise to sunset. (AM radio waves travel farther at night and WNYC had to protect WCCO from interference.) WNYC is also known for having an extensive online archive of broadcasts and recordings.

Great Depression and World War II
WNYCs transmitter was moved in 1937 from the Municipal Building to city-owned land at 10 Kent Street in Greenpoint, Brooklyn, as part of a Works Progress Administration project. In 1938 the Municipal Broadcasting System was established by the City of New York to run the station. For its first 14 years, WNYC had been run by the New York City Commissioner for Bridges, Plant and Structures. Now, under an agency devoted singularly to its function and with the leadership of new director Morris S. Novik, appointed by Mayor LaGuardia, WNYC became a model public broadcaster. Among its many landmark programs was the annual American Music Festival.

In 1941 the North American Regional Broadcasting Agreement shifted WNYCs frequency a second time, to 830 kHz. WCCO was moved to 830 as well, and was given clear-channel authority. WNYC would remain a 1,000-watt outlet for the next 48 years. Later that year, WNYC was the first radio station in New York City to announce the Japanese attack on Pearl Harbor. Beginning during World War II, the FCC allowed WNYC to stay on the air 6AM to 10PM (in addition to its normal daylight hours) due to the public service it was providing.

WNYC-FM began regularly scheduled broadcasts on the FM band on March 13, 1943, at 43.9 MHz. Known originally as W39NY, the FM outlet adopted its present WNYC-FM identity and its present frequency of 93.9 MHz within a few years. In 1961 the pair were joined by a television operation, as WUHF (channel 31) took to the air in an experimental format. The following year the station was renamed WNYC-TV.

The Municipal Broadcasting System (which was renamed the WNYC Communications Group in 1989) helped to form National Public Radio in 1971, and the WNYC stations were among the 90 stations that carried the inaugural broadcast of All Things Considered later that year.

In 1979, several Tri-State residents formed the WNYC Foundation as the stations' fundraising arm.

In 1990, as a result of continued interference with WCCO (and a court ruling in WCCO's favor rescinding the WWII-era approval for nighttime operation by WNYC), WNYC moved from 830 kHz to 820 kHz, commenced around-the-clock operations and increased its daytime power to 10,000 watts, while maintaining 1,000 watts at night, to protect WBAP in Fort Worth, Texas; WBAP is also a clear-channel 50,000-watt station but is farther from New York City than Minneapolis. The AM transmitter was moved to Belleville Turnpike in Kearny, New Jersey, sharing three towers with WMCA its former shared-time partner. The Brooklyn transmitter site was decommissioned and is now WNYC Transmitter Park.

The station's ownership by the City meant that it was occasionally subject to the whims of various mayors. As part of a crackdown on prostitution in 1979, then-Mayor Ed Koch tried to use WNYC to broadcast the names of "johns" and "janes" arrested for soliciting. Announcers threatened a walkout and station management refused to comply with the idea; after one broadcast the idea was abandoned. See John Hour.

Independence from the City
Shortly after assuming the mayoralty in 1994, Rudolph W. Giuliani announced he was considering selling the WNYC stations. Giuliani believed that broadcasting was no longer essential as a municipal service, and that the financial compensation from selling the stations could be used to help the City cover budget shortfalls. The final decision was made in March 1995: while the City opted to divest WNYC-TV (now WPXN-TV) through a blind auction to commercial buyers, WNYC-AM-FM was sold to the WNYC Foundation for $20 million over a six-year period, far less than what the stations could have been sold for if they were placed on the open market. While the sale put an end to the occasional political intrusions of the past, it required the WNYC Foundation to embark on a major appeal towards listeners, other foundations, and private benefactors. The station's audience and budget have continued to grow since the split from the city.

The terrorist attacks of September 11, 2001 destroyed WNYC-FM's transmitter atop the World Trade Center. WNYC's studios, in the nearby Manhattan Municipal Building, had to be evacuated and station staff was unable to return to its offices for three weeks. The FM signal was knocked off the air for a time. Various WNYC programs moved into studios loaned by the NPR's New York bureau,  WKCR-FM of Columbia University, and WNET. It broadcast on its still operating AM signal transmitting from towers in Kearny, New Jersey and by a live Internet stream, while its FM programming resumed on WNYE-FM's frequency, 91.5. The stations eventually returned to the Municipal Building. In 2022, WNYC's broadcasts on September 11 were selected by the Library of Congress for preservation in the National Recording Registry.

Move to new studios
On June 16, 2008, WNYC moved from its  of rent-free space scattered on eight floors of the Manhattan Municipal Building to a new location at 160 Varick Street, near the Holland Tunnel. The station now occupies 3 floors of a 12-story former printing building in Hudson Square.

The number of recording studios and booths has doubled, to 31. There is a new 140-seat, street-level studio for live broadcasts, concerts and public forums and an expansion of the newsroom of over 60 journalists.

Renovation, construction, rent and operating costs for the new Varick Street location amounted to $45 million. In addition to raising these funds, WNYC raised money for a one-time fund of $12.5 million to cover the cost of creating 40 more hours of new programming and three new shows. The total cost of $57.5 million for both the move and programming is nearly three times the $20 million the station had to raise over seven years to buy its licenses from the City in 1997.

Acquisition of WQXR
On October 8, 2009, WNYC took control of classical music station WQXR-FM, then at 96.3 FM. WQXR's intellectual property (call letters and format) was acquired from the New York Times Company as part of a three-way transaction with Univision Radio. WNYC also purchased the 105.9 FM frequency of Univision's WCAA (now WXNY-FM). WQXR-FM's classical format moved to 105.9 and WXNY's Spanish Tropical format debuted at 96.3. The deal resulted in WQXR becoming a non-commercial station. With WQXR as a co-owned 24-hour classical station, WNYC-FM dropped its remaining classical music programming to become a full-time news/talk station.

New Jersey expansion
On June 6, 2011, the New Jersey Public Broadcasting Authority agreed to sell four FM stations in northern New Jersey to New York Public Radio. The transaction was announced by Governor Chris Christie, as part of his long-term goal to end State-subsidized public broadcasting. The four stations were previously the northern half of New Jersey Network's statewide radio service, with the stations in southern New Jersey going to Philadelphia public radio station WHYY-FM. Upon taking control of the four stations on July 1, 2011, they were rebranded as New Jersey Public Radio.

Gothamist acquisition 
In late 2017, the website network including Gothamist, LAist, and DCist ceased operations. Three months later, in February 2018, anonymous donors funded a joint purchase of the properties by radio stations KPCC, WAMU, and WNYC, which would each operate the publication relevant to their broadcast region.

Past personalities

Past WNYC radio personalities include H. V. Kaltenborn, who hosted radio's first quiz program on WNYC in 1926, the Brooklyn Eagles Current Events Bee, a forerunner to shows like National Public Radio's Wait Wait... Don't Tell Me! In its early years the station lacked funds for a record library and would borrow albums from record stores around the Manhattan Municipal Building, where its studios were located. Legend has it a listener began lending classical records to the station and in 1929, WNYC began broadcast of Masterwork Hour, radio's first program of recorded classical music.

Following the U.S. entry into World War II, then-Mayor Fiorello La Guardia made use of the station every Sunday in his Talk to the People program. During a lengthy newspaper workers strike, La Guardia also used the WNYC airwaves to read the latest comic strips to local youngsters while they were not available in New York.

Margaret Juntwait, an announcer and classical music host at WNYC for 15 years, left for the Metropolitan Opera in September 2006. Prior to her death in 2015, Juntwait served as announcer for the Met's Saturday afternoon radio broadcasts, the first woman to hold the position and only the third regular announcer of the long-standing broadcast series, which was launched in 1931. John Schaefer, a music show host at WNYC since 1982, has written liner notes for more than 100 albums, for everyone from Yo-Yo Ma to Terry Riley and was named a "New York influential" by New York Magazine in 2006.

The Leonard Lopate Show, (originally New York & Company), hosted by Leonard Lopate, who was fired on December 21, 2017. The Leonard Lopate Show won a Peabody Award in 2012 "for considering all things New York in lively broadcasts that, like the host, value light more than heat."

Programming
WNYC produces and broadcasts programming for a local audience, including news and interview shows The Brian Lehrer Show and All of It with Alison Stewart, along with a roster of nationally syndicated WNYC Studios produced including Radiolab, On the Media, and The New Yorker Radio Hour. WNYC is a leading member station of NPR, broadcasting NPR's major daily news programs including Morning Edition and All Things Considered. WNYC also broadcasts programs from the BBC World Service and selected programs from other producers including This American Life, Wait Wait... Don't Tell Me!, and Fresh Air. The broadcasts airs on WNYC 93.9 FM and AM 820 in New York City, and also streams live over the internet at wnyc.org. As a result, the station reaches listeners from across the country and around the globe. 
WNYC-AM-FM has a local news team of approximately 60 journalists, producers, editors, and other broadcasting professionals.

WNYC and WNYC Studios programs and podcasts include:

 The Brian Lehrer Show is a two-hour weekday talk show covering local and national current events and social issues hosted by Brian Lehrer, a former anchor and reporter for NBC Radio Network. It won a Peabody Award in 2007 "for facilitating reasoned conversation about critical issues and opening it up to everyone within earshot." In 2014, the show won first place in the Garden State Journalists Association Awards.
 All of It with Alison Stewart covers culture in the broadest sense - religion, food, language, music etc.  In October 2019 the show launched the monthly book club Get Lit with All of It. In April 2020, as New York City neared the peak of the COVID-19 pandemic, the show partnered with the New York Public Library to shift the book club to a virtual monthly event.
 On the Media is a nationally syndicated, weekly one-hour program hosted by Brooke Gladstone covering the media and its effect on American culture and society. Stories also regularly cover such topics as video news releases, net neutrality, media consolidation, censorship, freedom of the press, spin, and how the media is changing with technology. It won a Peabody Award in 2004 for providing listeners "an insightful journey into the inner workings and outer effects of the media.". In 2013, then co-host Brooke Gladstone won a Gracie Award for Outstanding Host. The episode "Bench Press", which looked at the Supreme Court and its relationship with the media, won both a New York Press Club Award and the American Bar Association's Silver Gavel Award in 2016. Bob Garfield co-hosted the program until 2021, when he was fired from WNYC for violating its anti-bullying policies.
New Sounds – Since 1982, founder and host John Schaefer has devoted the program to present new and eclectic music. The New York Times hailed the program as "a genre-defying radio program that has played an outsize role in [New York City's] new music scene for nearly four decades." In early 2018, the 24-hour streaming music site NewSounds.org was launched.
Radio Rookies – provides teenagers with the tools and training to create radio stories about themselves, their communities and their world. The show won a Peabody Award in 2005 for "teaching teens the fundamentals of radio reporting and giving listeners unvarnished insights into worlds ignored and disregarded," with the awarding body calling the show "ingenious." In 2017 the story "Gentrification: Feeling Like an Outsider in Your Own Neighborhood" won a National Edward R. Murrow Award. One of the stories from a rookie reporter, "Trying to Graduate from High School at 21", won both a Regional and National Edward R. Murrow Award in 2019.
Trump, Inc., hosted by Peabody Award-winning journalist Andrea Bernstein and Ilya Marritz, is a joint reporting project with ProPublica about President Donald Trump, his family, and the Trump administration's potential conflicts of interest. In 2018 the show was awarded an Alfred I. duPont-Columbia University Award, the medallion for Radio Features News in the Excellence in Journalism Award Competition conducted by the Society of the Silurians, and Apple named it as one of the most popular podcasts launched that year.
Fishko Files – Sara Fishko produces sound-rich essays on art, culture, music and media. The feature "Realism and Rebellion" won a Regional Edward R. Murrow Award in 2019.
The Takeaway – a weekday one-hour news show, hosted by Melissa Harris-Perry, co-produced with Public Radio Exchange.
Death, Sex & Money – Host Anna Sale talks to celebrities and regular people about relationships, money, family, work and making it all count.
Radiolab – two-time Peabody Award-winning podcast attempts to approach broad, difficult topics such as "time" and "morality" in an accessible and light-hearted manner and with a distinctive audio production style. Hosted by  Jad Abumrad, Lulu Miller, and Latif Nasser.
Free Shakespeare on the Radio was a co-production between WNYC Studios and The Public Theater that reimagined the Theater's annual "Free Shakespeare in the Park" as  a multi-episode radio play. The production was conceived after the COVID-19 pandemic prevented the annual outdoor play from taking place, the first time in nearly 60 years. The originally scheduled performance of Richard II was adapted for radio and directed by Saheem Ali. The performance was dedicated to the Black Lives Matter movement and featured a cast composed predominantly of BIPOC actors, including André Holland, Phylicia Rashad, and Lupita Nyong'o. The New York Times said the cast "delivered electric performances, spotlighting the aural delights of Shakespeare's language."

Listenership and new media
WNYC has been an early adopter of new technologies including HD radio, live audio streaming, and podcasting. RSS feeds and email newsletters link to archived audio of individual program segments. WNYC also makes some of its programming available on Sirius XM satellite radio.

See also 
 WPXN-TV (channel 31, formerly WNYC-TV)
 WNYC Studios
 Media in New York City

References

External links

New York Public radio website
Broadcast Schedule (New York Public Radio)
WNYC historical profile (1978) at NY Radio News
Porter Anderson announces Challenge Grant for WQXR's Q2 Music(2011) by Victoria Mixon
WNYC Archives and Preservation

NPR member stations
Peabody Award winners
Radio stations established in 1924
Radio stations established in 1943
HD Radio stations
NYC
NPR member networks
New York Public Radio
Hudson Square